Michael Gelven, (1937-2018) was a Distinguished Research Professor Emeritus of Philosophy at Northern Illinois University, where he taught for 46 years.  Gelven held a Ph.D. in philosophy from Washington University, penned a well known commentary on Martin Heidegger's Being and Time, and wrote several books as well as numerous scholarly articles.  Gelven was primarily interested in continental philosophy and had a wide range of specialties including: ontology, metaphysics, Heidegger, Kant, Nietzsche, philosophy in literature, and the philosophy of war.

Bibliography

Books
A Commentary on Heidegger's Being and Time (1st edition) (1970)
Winter, friendship, and guilt; the sources of self-inquiry (1973)
A Commentary on Heidegger's Being and Time (2nd edition) (Sep 1989)
Truth and Existence: A Philosophical Inquiry (Nov 1990)
Spirit and Existence: A Philosophical Inquiry (Aug 1990)
Why Me?: A Philosophical Inquiry into Fate (Nov 1991)
The Quest for the Fine (Jan 1996)
The Risk of Being: What It Means to Be Good and Bad (Nov 1997)
This Side of Evil (Jun 1999)
Truth and the Comedic Art (Sep 2000)
War and Existence: A Philosophical Inquiry (Jan 30, 2000)
The Asking Mystery: A Philosophical Inquiry (Mar 2000)
What Happens to Us When We Think: Transformation and Reality (Jul 2003)
Judging Hope: A Reach to the True and the False (Jun 2004)

Articles
“Language as Saying and Showing,” Journal of Value Inquiry (1983)
“The Literary and the True,” Man and World (1984)
“Nietzsche's Existential Methodology,” Proceedings of the Heraclitean Society (1985)
“Is Sacrifice a Virtue,” Journal of Value Inquiry (1987)

See also
American philosophy
List of American philosophers

External links
Gelven's NIU website

American philosophers
Living people
Heidegger scholars
Year of birth missing (living people)